The men's normal hill individual ski jumping competition for the 2014 Winter Olympics in Sochi, Russia, was held on 8–9 February 2014 at RusSki Gorki Jumping Center in the Esto-Sadok village on the northern slope of Aibga Ridge in Krasnaya Polyana.

Results

Qualifying
50 ski jumpers qualify for the finals. The top 10 ski jumpers from the World Cup season pre-qualify for the finals. The top 40 ski jumpers from qualifying fill the final 40 spots in the finals.

Final
The final was started at 21:30.

References

Ski jumping at the 2014 Winter Olympics
Men's events at the 2014 Winter Olympics